Jackson Township is an inactive township in Polk County, in the U.S. state of Missouri.

Jackson Township has the name of President Andrew Jackson.

References

Townships in Missouri
Townships in Polk County, Missouri